Silvia Steinbauer (born 17 February 1964) is an Austrian handball player who played for the Austrian national team. She represented Austria at the 1984 Summer Olympics in Los Angeles.

References

1964 births
Living people
Austrian female handball players
Olympic handball players of Austria
Handball players at the 1984 Summer Olympics